The Chester Fritz Auditorium (CFA) is a performance facility on the campus of the University of North Dakota (UND) located in the city of Grand Forks, North Dakota.

"The Fritz," as it is commonly known, has a maximum capacity of 2,384 and is used for many events including concerts, dance recitals, and popular Broadway musicals.  The auditorium also plays host to university events including some commencement ceremonies, lectures, and conferences. The building measures 85 feet in height and the facade is constructed mainly of brick and pre-cast concrete sections. It sits on the banks of the English Coulee, which meanders its way through the UND campus.

Chester Fritz (March 25, 1892 - July 28, 1983), a notable alumnus of UND, gave the university $1 million in 1965 for the construction of a "distinctive auditorium" on the campus.  The finished auditorium cost $3 million, with additional funds received from the state of North Dakota and private donations.  The Chester Fritz Library, the main library at UND, is also named after Chester Fritz.

References

Related Reading
Fritz, Chester and Dan Rylance  (1982)  Ever Westward to the Far East: The Story of Chester Fritz (Grand Forks: University of North Dakota)

External links 
Chester Fritz Auditorium website

University of North Dakota
Buildings and structures in Grand Forks, North Dakota
Tourist attractions in Grand Forks, North Dakota
Theatres in North Dakota